Toretsk, formerly Dzerzhynsk, is a city of oblast significance in Donetsk Oblast (province) of Ukraine. As of January 2022 its population was approximately

History

The settlement Shcherbynovka was founded in 1806 in Russian Empire.

A local newspaper is published here since September 1936.

In October 1938 the urban-type settlement Shcherbynovka became a city Dzerzhynsk, in honor of Felix Dzerzhynsky, founder of the Soviet secret police, and architect of the Red Terror and de-Cossackization of the region.

In 1989, the population was 50,538 people.

In 2013, the population was 35 296 people.

Starting mid-April 2014 Russian-backed paramilitaries captured several towns in Donetsk Oblast; including the former Dzerzhynsk. On 11 July 2014 Ukrainian forces launched strikes against these militias. On 21 July 2014, Ukrainian forces secured the city from Russian forces. Toretsk is only a few kilometers away from the occupied city of Horlivka.

Following the 2015 law on decommunization, the city council has decided on 16 October 2015 to rename the city to Toretsk. The name was approved by the Verkhovna Rada (the Ukrainian parliament) on 4 February 2016.

Because of the War in Donbass the city has had its water supply cut multiple times.

Nikolai Ryzhkov, a former Premier of the Soviet Union, was born in the city in 1929.

Demographics
As of the Ukrainian Census of 2001, the majority of residents identified as ethnic Ukrainians and spoke Russian as their first language:

Ethnicity
Ukrainians: 61.4%
Russians: 36.1%
Belarusians: 1%
Tatars: 0.3%
Romani people: 0.3%

First language
Russian: 87.1%
Ukrainian: 12.2%
Romani: 0.2%
Belarusian: 0.1%
Armenian: 0.1%

Gallery

References

Cities in Donetsk Oblast
Cities of regional significance in Ukraine
Populated places established in the Russian Empire
City name changes in Ukraine
Former Soviet toponymy in Ukraine
Populated places established in 1806
Bakhmut Raion